E Album is the fifth studio album of Japanese group KinKi Kids. It was released on July 25, 2001. Debuting at the top of the Oricon charts, the album sold 400,480 copies in its first week. The album was certified platinum by the RIAJ for 400,000 copies shipped to stores in Japan.

Track listing

References

 E Album. Johnny's net. Retrieved October 31, 2009.

External links
 Official KinKi Kids website

2001 albums
KinKi Kids albums